The Yates Cup is a Canadian sports trophy, presented annually to the winner of the Ontario University Athletics football conference of U Sports. It is the oldest still-existing football trophy in North America, dating back to 1898 and surpassing both the Grey Cup and the Little Brown Jug in longevity.

The Yates Cup was donated by Dr. Henry Brydges Yates of McGill University.

Until 1971 it was awarded to the winner of the Senior Intercollegiate Football League regular season, with playoffs occurring only if there was a tie for first place, or the second-place team had defeated the first-place team in league play. Since 1971, it is awarded to the OUA football champion.

The winner of the Yates Cup goes on to play in either the Uteck Bowl or the Mitchell Bowl, depending on annual rotations.

Asteroid (12447) YatesCup is named after the Yates Cup.

Yates Cup games
Notes: From 1915 to 1918, the trophy was not presented due to World War I. From 1940 to 1945, the trophy was not presented due to World War II. From 1974 to 1978, due to a change in conference structure, the Yates Cup was presented to both an Eastern Division and a Western Division winner. In 1979 the Eastern and Western Division champions played each other in a Vanier Cup semi-final game, which also determined the Yates Cup championship. In 1980, the Cup returned to a single winner when the Eastern Division formed the independent OQIFC.

Championship titles

Note*: McGill entered the Quebec Conference in 1971 and stopped competing for the Yates Cup. Instead, the conference championship ended in the Dunsmore Cup.

References

 Past Champions from Ontario University Athletics

U Sports football trophies and awards